is a district in Nagano Prefecture, Japan.

The total area is 637.66 km2.

Towns and villages
Ikeda
Hakuba
Matsukawa
Otari

Districts in Nagano Prefecture